Oppstryn is a village in Stryn Municipality in Vestland county, Norway. The village is located on the southern shore of the large lake Oppstrynsvatnet. Norwegian National Road 15 runs through the village on its way to the village of Stryn. Oppstryn Church is located in this village.

The mountain Skåla lies just southwest of the village, inside Jostedalsbreen National Park.

References

Villages in Vestland
Stryn